Hoston is a village in the municipality of Orkland in Trøndelag county, Norway.

References

Orkland
Villages in Trøndelag